Three Men Walking is an album by American composer, composer, saxophone and clarinet player Joe Maneri with guitarist Joe Morris and violinist Mat Maneri recorded in 1995 and released on the ECM label.

Reception
The Allmusic review by Stacia Proefrock awarded the album 4 stars stating "The music here is radically creative without being inaccessible, a beautiful example of innovation in jazz".

Track listing
All compositions by Joe Maneri except as indicated
 "Calling" - 3:15 
 "What's New?" (Johnny Burke, Bob Haggart) - 9:47 
 "Bird's in the Belfry" (Joe Maneri, Mat Maneri, Joe Morris) - 6:54 
 "If Not Now" (Morris) - 3:22 
 "Let Me Tell You" (Maneri, Maneri, Morris) - 2:04 
 "Through a Glass Darkly" - 4:58 
 "Three Men Walking" (Maneri, Maneri, Morris) - 5:24 
 "Deep Paths" (Maneri, Maneri, Morris) - 9:16 
 "Diuturnal" - 3:34 
 "Fevered" (Maneri, Maneri, Morris) - 5:40 
 "Gestalt" - 2:40 
 "To Anne's Eyes" (Morris) - 2:07 
 "Arc and Point" (Maneri, Maneri, Morris) - 5:06 
 "For Josef Schmid" - 2:09 
Recorded at Hardstudios in Winterthur, Switzerland in October/November 1995

Personnel
Joe Maneri - clarinet, alto saxophone, tenor saxophone, piano
Joe Morris - electric guitar
Mat Maneri - electric 6 string violin

References

 

1996 albums
ECM Records albums
Joe Maneri albums